Shepperton Ferry was a train ferry built for the Southern Railway in 1934. Requisitioned by the Royal Navy during World War II, she served as the minelayer, troopship and heavy lift ship HMS Shepperton. She was returned to the Southern Railway post-war and saw service with them and their successor British Railways until 1972, when she was scrapped.

Description

History
Shepperton Ferry was built by Swan Hunter & Wigham Richardson Ltd, Low Walker, Northumberland as Yard Number 1450 for the Southern Railway. Launched on 23 October 1934, she was completed in March 1935 and entered service on the Dover - Dunkerque route. Shepperton Ferry was allocated the Official Number 163583. Her port of registry was London and she was allocated the Code Letters GYJJ. The ship could carry 12 sleeping cars or 40 railway wagons. She also had space for 25 motor cars and 500 passengers.

In 1939, Shepperton Ferry was requisitioned by the Admiralty and converted to a minelayer for the Royal Navy under the name HMS Shepperton. Her pennant number was M83. She was armed with a 4" anti-aircraft gun and two .303 machine guns and carried 270 mines. She operated in the English Channel. She remained in Royal Naval service until 5 May 1941 when she was declared a Constructive Total Loss after an air raid at Belfast.
Other sources state that in 1940, she was transferred to the Ministry of War Transport and regained her original name. She was converted to a troopship and used on the Stranraer - Larne route. In 1944, Shepperton Ferry was converted to a heavy lift ship. She was fitted with a gantry crane which enabled her to lift steam locomotives.

Following the cessation of hostilities, Shepperton Ferry was converted back to a train ferry and returned to the Southern Railway. She returned to the Dover - Dunkerque route. Ownership passed to the British Transport Commission upon the nationalisation of the railways in 1948. In 1950, Shepperton Ferry was fitted with additional flooring on her train deck, which gave her a capacity of 100 motor cars. On 29 November, she struck the submerged wreck of a Royal Navy motor torpedo boat at Dunkerque in a gale. She was freed by five tugs.

In each of the years between 1962 and 1965, Shepperton Ferry spent up to a month on the Stranraer - Larne route. With the introduction of IMO Numbers in the late 1960s, she was allocated the IMO Number 5322544. was withdrawn from service on 26 August 1972 and laid up at Dover before being sold to Hierro Ardes SA, Bilbao, Spain for scrapping. Shepperton Ferry arrived at Bilbao for scrapping on 17 September 1972.

References

1934 ships
Ships built by Swan Hunter
Train ferries
Merchant ships of the United Kingdom
Minelayers of the Royal Navy
Ministry of War Transport ships
Troop ships
Heavy lift ships
Maritime incidents in 1950
Ships of the Southern Railway (UK)
Ships of British Rail